Fire Sale may refer to:

 Fire sale, a sale of goods at extremely discounted prices
 Fire Sale (film), a 1977 American comedy
 "Fire Sale", a 1991 episode of the TV series Super Mario World
 Fire Sale, a 2013 exhibition of art by Robert Del Naja of the band Massive Attack
 "Fire sale", a fictional cyberattack in the 2007 film Live Free or Die Hard
 Fire Sale, an American band made up of former members of the Ataris and Face to Face